Vincent Macaigne (born 19 October 1978) is a French actor, theatre director and film director. He is also a screenwriter and playwright.

Life and career
Macaigne was raised in Paris, the son of a French businessman and an Iranian-born painter. He has an elder brother, who is a forensic doctor. He attended the CNSAD between 1999 and 2002, and staged his first play in 2004. Throughout the 2000s, he acted in several theatre productions and also wrote and staged a number of plays. He suffered two strokes at just thirty years old, one of which occurred after his 2009 staging of the theatrical adaptation of Fyodor Dostoyevsky's The Idiot. In an interview, he said the stroke has had no lasting consequences to his health.

His short film What We'll Leave Behind (Ce qu'il restera de nous) won the Grand Prix at the Clermont-Ferrand International Short Film Festival, and was nominated for the César Award for Best Short Film.

In 2014, he received nominations for the César Award for Most Promising Actor and the Lumières Award for Most Promising Actor for his role in La Fille du 14 juillet.

His directorial feature film debut, Dom Juan, is an adaptation of the play of the same name by Molière. It was screened in the Cineasts of the Present section at the 2015 Locarno International Film Festival.

Filmography

As actor

As filmmaker

References

External links

 

1978 births
Living people
People from Paris
French male film actors
French male stage actors
20th-century French male actors
21st-century French male actors
French National Academy of Dramatic Arts alumni
French theatre directors
French film directors
French male screenwriters
French screenwriters
20th-century French dramatists and playwrights
21st-century French dramatists and playwrights